South Westfield Township is one of fifteen townships in Surry County, North Carolina, United States. The township had a population of 2,058 according to the 2000 census.

Geographically, South Westfield Township occupies  in eastern Surry County.  There are no incorporated municipalities within South Westfield Township; however, there are several smaller, unincorporated communities located here, including Indian Grove.

Townships in Surry County, North Carolina
Townships in North Carolina